Kashino Dikro is a 1979 Indian Gujarati film directed by Kanti Madia. Being the first and the only film of Madia, it starred Rajiv, Ragini, Rita Bhaduri, and Pranlal Kharsani. The film was produced by Cine India International. Adapted from Vinodini Nilkanth's short story Dariyav Dil, film's script and dialogues were written by Prabodh Joshi. Barun Mukherji was a cinematographer.

The film features music composed by Kshemu Divetia, who earned State Films Award in Best Music Director category for the film.

Plot 
Kashi (Ragini) raises her brother-in-law (Rajiv), who dies on his wedding night from snakebite. His widowed wife Rama (Bhaduri) get raped by Kashi's husband, and she becomes pregnant. Kashi decides to save her family's as well as Rama's honour by pretending to be a pregnant herself, and later adopts Rama's son as her own. In the end, Kashi dies. She has been described as an icon of saintly motherhood.

Cast 
The cast was:
Rajiv
Ragini
Rita Bhaduri
Girish Desai
Pranlal Kharsani
Tarla Joshi
Leela Jariwala
Vatsala Deshmukh
Mahavir Shah
Arvind Vaidya
Saroj Nayak
Jagdish Shah
Pushpa Shah
Javed Khan
Shrikant Soni
Dilip Patel
Kanti Madia

Sound track 
Kashino Dikro features songs written by Balmukund Dave, Ravji Patel, Madhav Ramanuj, Anil Joshi, and Ramesh Parekh.

References

External links 

 

Films about rape in India
Films about widowhood in India
Indian pregnancy films
1970s pregnancy films
1970s Gujarati-language films